Christopher Estridge (born September 21, 1989 in Brownsburg, Indiana) is a former American soccer player.

Career

College and Amateur
Estridge started his college soccer career at Wake Forest University in 2008, before moving to Indiana University in 2010. Estridge was named NSCAA All-American First Team and All-Big Ten Conference First Team in 2011.

Estridge played for USL Premier Development League club Chicago Fire Premier in 2011.

Professional
Vancouver Whitecaps FC selected Estridge in the second round (No. 21 overall) of the 2012 MLS SuperDraft. However, he was cut by the club on February 17, 2012 during their pre-season and was later traded to Real Salt Lake in exchange for a conditional 2013 MLS Supplemental Draft pick on April 11, 2012.

Estridge was released by Salt Lake on June 28, 2012. He was later signed by USL Professional Division club Rochester Rhinos.

Estridge moved to USL club Charlotte Independence on March 25, 2015.

Career statistics

Club

all Statistics as of April 21, 2014

References

External links
 

1989 births
Living people
All-American men's college soccer players
American soccer players
Association football defenders
North Carolina Fusion U23 players
Charlotte Independence players
Chicago Fire U-23 players
Indiana Hoosiers men's soccer players
Indy Eleven players
North American Soccer League players
North Carolina FC players
Real Salt Lake players
Rochester New York FC players
Soccer players from Indianapolis
USL Championship players
USL League Two players
Vancouver Whitecaps FC draft picks
Wake Forest Demon Deacons men's soccer players